Anuj Kumar Taliyan (हवलदार अनुज कुमार) is an Indian professional bodybuilder. He won gold medal at the 11th World Bodybuilding Championships that was held at the Jeju Island in South Korea at November 2019. He is one of the most successful bodybuilder in India. He won many national and International titles.

In 2018, he had won the Mr India title in 2018 at the 12th National Body Building Championship.He also won gold medal at the 54th Asian Bodybuilding and Physique Sports Championships 2022 held in Maldives.

References

Indian bodybuilders
Living people
Professional bodybuilders
Male bodybuilders
Year of birth missing (living people)